Tschopp is a surname. Notable people with the surname include:

Evelyne Tschopp (born 1991), Swiss judoka
Jürg Tschopp (1951–2011), Swiss biochemist and immunologist
Marcel Tschopp (born 1974), Liechtenstein long-distance runner
Marco Tschopp (born 1978), Swiss footballer
Johann Tschopp (born 1982), Swiss mountain bike racer
Rahel Tschopp (born 2000), Swiss footballer
Willy Tschopp (1905–1987), Swiss sprinter

See also 
Tschop (disambiguation)